Jeronimo Lim Kim (1926–2006) was a Korean Cuban who was known for being a part of the Cuban Revolution. He was a law school classmate of Fidel Castro.

Early life
Jeronimo's father, Lim Cheon-taek (1903–1985), left Korea in hope of a better life to go to Mexico. From Mexico, Cheon-taek went to Cuba in 1921. Jeronimo was the oldest of six children. He was the first Korean to attend university in Cuba. He went to law school at Havana University.

Cuban Revolution
Jeronimo worked with Che Guevara in pushing forth the Cuban Revolution. He helped foster relations between North Korea, and as a result North Korea and Cuba became strong allies.

Legacy and later life
Jeronimo became the Chief Agent at the National Revolutionary Police Force. He was said to be a non-ideologue who only wanted his people to do better.  Some have labeled Jeronimo to be the Cuba's Ahn Chang-ho. 

Jeronimo is the subject of a documentary titled Jeronimo: The Untold Tale of Koreans in Cuba.

References

See also
Koreans in Cuba
Koreans in Mexico

Asian Cuban
Ethnic groups in Cuba
Korean diaspora in North America
Korean Latin American
1926 births
2006 deaths
Cuban people of Korean descent